Roland Melis (born November 13, 1974) is an athlete from the Netherlands Antilles, who competed in the triathlon.

Melis competed at the first Olympic triathlon at the 2000 Summer Olympics.  He took forty-fifth place with a total time of 1:56:11.95.

References
sports-reference

1974 births
Living people
Dutch Antillean triathletes
Dutch male triathletes 
Triathletes at the 1999 Pan American Games
Triathletes at the 2000 Summer Olympics
Pan American Games competitors for the Netherlands Antilles
Olympic triathletes of the Netherlands Antilles
Duathletes